Souleymane Tandia (born 30 August 1987 in Dakar) is a Senegalese professional footballer who plays for East Riffa in Bahrain.

References

External links

1987 births
Living people
Footballers from Dakar
Senegalese footballers
Association football defenders
OGC Nice players
Gimnàstic de Tarragona footballers
UD Melilla footballers
Budapest Honvéd FC players
Nemzeti Bajnokság I players
Senegalese expatriate footballers
Expatriate footballers in France
Expatriate footballers in Spain
Expatriate footballers in Belgium
Expatriate footballers in Hungary
Senegalese expatriate sportspeople in France
Senegalese expatriate sportspeople in Spain
Senegalese expatriate sportspeople in Belgium
Senegalese expatriate sportspeople in Hungary